Belfast Willowfield was a constituency of the Parliament of Northern Ireland.

Boundaries
Belfast Willowfield was a borough constituency comprising part of southern Belfast.  It was created in 1929 when the House of Commons (Method of Voting and Redistribution of Seats) Act (Northern Ireland) 1929 introduced first past the post elections throughout Northern Ireland.

Belfast Willowfield was created by the division of Belfast South into four new constituencies.  It survived unchanged, returning one member of Parliament, until the Parliament of Northern Ireland was temporarily suspended in 1972, and then formally abolished in 1973.

Politics
In common with other seats in south Belfast, the constituency was strongly unionist. The seat was generally held by Unionist candidates, although labour movement candidates often performed well and sometimes took the seat.

Members of Parliament

Election results

At the 1933 Northern Ireland general election, Arthur Black was elected unopposed.

References

Willowfield
Northern Ireland Parliament constituencies established in 1929
Northern Ireland Parliament constituencies disestablished in 1973